Dimelaena is a genus of lichenized fungi in the family Caliciaceae. Members of the genus are commonly called mountain lichens, or moonglow lichens. They are placodioid crustose lichens, ranging in form from rimose to areolate. The genus has a widespread distribution and contains eight species.

Species
Dimelaena australiensis  (1984)
Dimelaena elevata  (1996)
Dimelaena ewersii  (2017)
Dimelaena lichenicola  (2013)
Dimelaena mayrhoferiana  (2018)
Dimelaena oreina  (1852)
Dimelaena radiata  (1884
Dimelaena subsquamulosa  (2014)
Dimelaena tenuis  (1996)
Dimelaena triseptata  (2008)

References

Caliciales
Lichen genera
Caliciales genera
Taxa described in 1852